The  Brennabor Typ P, launched in 1919,  is the first car introduced by the Brennabor company after the First World War.   For a few years in the early 1920s this middle market model, with production reaching 100 units per day just for the domestic market, took the company to the top of the German auto-sales charts.

The car was powered by a 4-cylinder side-valve engine of 2.1 litres, mounted ahead of the driver and delivering 24 hp at 2,400 rpm.   Power was delivered to the rear wheels through an asbestos lined clutch and a four-speed gear box controlled with a gear lever mounted outside the passenger area, directly to the right of the driver's seat.   (As was normal at this time, the driver sat on the right-hand side of the car.)

The car sat on a U-profile pressed steel chassis with rigid axles and semi-elliptical leaf springing.   It came as a P6 version with a six-seater open-topped body or as a P11, featuring a more sporty open-topped four-seater body.   The mechanically linked foot brake operated on the drive shaft, while the hand brake operated directly against the rear wheels.

A successor model, the Brennabor Typ PW, appeared in 1925.   This shared the 2.1-litre engine of the earlier Typ P, but claimed maximum power was increased to 32 hp, achieved, now, at 2,600 rpm.   The gear lever was relocated from the right hand edge of the car to a central floor-mounted position, which necessitated changing gear with the left hand, since the driver continued to be conventionally positioned on the right-hand side of the car.   The wheelbase was unchanged, but the standard bodies were nevertheless a little longer than on the previous model.

A third body style joined the existing two, as the Typ P was now offered, as the P15, with a four-door body.

Taking the Typ P and the Typ PW together, by 1927 approximately 10,000 of the Brennabor Typ P models had been produced.

Technical Details

Sources 
 Oswald, Werner: Deutsche Autos 1920–1945, Motorbuch Verlag Stuttgart, 10. Auflage (1996), 

Brennabor vehicles